Checkers (American English), also known as draughts (British English), is a group of strategy board games for two players which involve diagonal moves of uniform game pieces and mandatory captures by jumping over opponent pieces. Checkers is developed from alquerque. The term "checkers" derives from the checkered board which the game is played on, whereas "draughts" derives from the verb "to draw" or "to move".

The most popular forms of checkers in Anglophone countries are American checkers (also called English draughts), which is played on an 8×8 checkerboard; Russian draughts, Turkish draughts both on an 8x8 board, and International draughts, played on a 10×10 board – the latter is widely played in many countries worldwide. There are many other variants played on 8×8 boards. Canadian checkers and Singaporean/Malaysian checkers (also locally known as dum) are played on a 12×12 board.

American checkers was weakly solved in 2007 by a team of Canadian computer scientists led by Jonathan Schaeffer. From the standard starting position, perfect play by each side would result in a draw.

General rules
Checkers is played by two opponents on opposite sides of the game board. One player has dark pieces (usually black); the other has light pieces (usually white or red). Players alternate turns. A player cannot move an opponent's pieces. A move consists of moving a piece diagonally to an adjacent unoccupied square. If the adjacent square contains an opponent's piece, and the square immediately beyond it is vacant, the piece may be captured (and removed from the game) by jumping over it.

Only the dark squares of the checkerboard are used. A piece can only move diagonally into an unoccupied square. When capturing an opponent's piece is possible, capturing is mandatory in most official rules. If the player does not capture, the other player can remove the opponent's piece as a penalty (or muffin), and where there are two or more such positions the player forfeits pieces that cannot be moved (although some rule variations make capturing optional). In almost all variants, the player without pieces remaining, or who cannot move due to being blocked, loses the game.

Pieces

Man
An uncrowned piece (man) moves one step diagonally forwards and captures an adjacent opponent's piece by jumping over it and landing on the next square. Multiple enemy pieces can be captured in a single turn provided this is done by successive jumps made by a single piece; the jumps do not need to be in the same line and may "zigzag" (change diagonal direction). In American checkers, men can jump only forwards; in international draughts and Russian draughts, men can jump both forwards and backwards.

King 

When a man reaches the farthest row forward, known as the kings row or crown head, it becomes a king. It is marked by placing an additional piece on top of, or crowning, the first man. The king has additional powers, including the ability to move backwards and, in variants where men cannot already do so, capture backwards. Like a man, a king can make successive jumps in a single turn, provided that each jump captures an enemy piece.

In international draughts, kings (also called flying kings) move any distance along unblocked diagonals. They may capture an opposing man any distance away by jumping to any of the unoccupied squares immediately beyond it. Because jumped pieces remain on the board until the turn is complete, it is possible to reach a position in a multi-jump move where the flying king is blocked from capturing further by a piece already jumped.

Flying kings are not used in American checkers; a king's only advantage over a man is the additional ability to move and capture backwards.

Naming
In most non-English languages (except those that acquired the game from English speakers), checkers is called dame, dames, damas, or a similar term that refers to ladies. The pieces are usually called men, stones, "peón" (pawn) or a similar term; men promoted to kings are called dames or ladies. In these languages, the queen in chess or in card games is usually called by the same term as the kings in checkers. A case in point includes the Greek terminology, in which checkers is called "ντάμα" (dama), which is also one term for the queen in chess.

History

Ancient games 
Similar games have been played for  millennia. A board resembling a checkers board was found in Ur dating from 3000 BC. In the British Museum are specimens of ancient Egyptian checkerboards, found with their pieces in burial chambers, and the game was played by the pharaoh Hatshepsut. Plato mentioned a game, πεττεία or petteia, as being of Egyptian origin, and Homer also mentions it. The method of capture was placing two pieces on either side of the opponent's piece. It was said to have been played during the Trojan War. The Romans played a derivation of petteia called latrunculi, or the game of the Little Soldiers. The pieces, and sporadically the game itself, were called calculi (pebbles).

Alquerque 

An Arabic game called Quirkat or al-qirq, with similar play to modern checkers, was played on a 5×5 board. It is mentioned in the tenth-century work Kitab al-Aghani. Al qirq was also the name for the game that is now called nine men's morris. Al qirq was brought to Spain by the Moors, where it became known as Alquerque, the Spanish derivation of the Arabic name. The rules are given in the 13th-century book Libro de los juegos. In about 1100, probably in the south of France, the game of Alquerque was adapted using backgammon pieces on a chessboard. Each piece was called a "fers", the same name as the chess queen, as the move of the two pieces was the same at the time.

Crowning 

The rule of crowning was used by the 13th century, as it is mentioned in the Philippe Mouskés's Chronique in 1243 when the game was known as Fierges, the name used for the chess queen (derived from the Persian ferz, meaning royal counsellor or vizier). The pieces became known as "dames" when that name was also adopted for the chess queen. The rule forcing players to take whenever possible was introduced in France in around 1535, at which point the game became known as Jeu forcé, identical to modern American checkers. The game without forced capture became known as Le jeu plaisant de dames, the precursor of international checkers.

The 18th-century English author Samuel Johnson wrote a foreword to a 1756 book about checkers by William Payne, the earliest book in English about the game.

Invented variants 

Blue and Gray: On a 9×9 board, each side has 17 guard pieces that move and jump in any direction, to escort a captain piece which races to the centre of the board to win.
Cheskers: A variant invented by Solomon Golomb.  Each player begins with a bishop and a camel (which jumps with coordinates (3,1) rather than (2,1) so as to stay on the black squares), and men reaching the back rank promote to a bishop, camel, or king.
 Damath: A variant utilising math principles and numbered chips popular in the Philippines.
 Dameo: A variant played on an 8×8 board that utilizes all 64 squares and has diagonal and orthogonal movement. A special "sliding" move is used for moving a line of checkers similar to the movement rule in Epaminondas. By Christian Freeling (2000).
 Hexdame: A literal adaptation of international draughts to a hexagonal gameboard. By Christian Freeling (1979).
 Lasca: A checkers variant on a 7×7 board, with 25 fields used. Jumped pieces are placed under the jumper, so that towers are built. Only the top piece of a jumped tower is captured. This variant was invented by World Chess Champion Emanuel Lasker.
 Philosophy shogi checkers: A variant on a 9×9 board, game ending with capturing opponent's king. Invented by Inoue Enryō and described in Japanese book in 1890.
 Suicide checkers (also called Anti-Checkers, Giveaway Checkers or Losing Draughts): A variant where the objective of each player is to lose all of their pieces.
 Tiers: A complex variant which allows players to upgrade their pieces beyond kings.
 Vigman's draughts: Each player has 24 pieces (two full sets) – one on the light squares, a second set on dark squares. Each player plays two games simultaneously: one on light squares, the other on dark squares. The total result is the sum of results for both games.

Computer checkers 

American checkers (English draughts) has been the arena for several notable advances in game artificial intelligence. In 1951 Christopher Strachey wrote the first video game program on checkers. The checkers program tried to run for the first time on 30 July 1951 at NPL, but was unsuccessful due to program errors. In the summer of 1952 he successfully ran the program on Ferranti Mark 1 computer and played the first computer checkers and arguably the first video game ever according to certain definitions.  In the 1950s, Arthur Samuel created one of the first board game-playing programs of any kind.  More recently, in 2007 scientists at the University of Alberta developed their "Chinook" program to the point where it is unbeatable. A brute force approach that took hundreds of computers working nearly two decades was used to solve the game, showing that a game of checkers will always end in a draw if neither player makes a mistake. The solution is for the checkers variation called go-as-you-please (GAYP) checkers and not for the variation called three-move restriction checkers. As of December 2007, this makes American checkers the most complex game ever solved.

In Nov 1983, the Science Museum Oklahoma (then called the Omniplex) unveiled a new exhibit: Lefty the Checker Playing Robot. Programmed by Scott M Savage, Lefty used an Armdroid robotic arm by Colne Robotics and was powered by a 6502 processor with a combination of Basic and Assembly code to interactively play a round of checkers with visitors to the museum. Originally, the program was deliberately simple so that the average museum visitor could potentially win, but over time was improved. The improvements however proved to be more frustrating for the visitors, so the original code was reimplemented.

Computational complexity 
Generalized Checkers is played on an N × N board.

It is PSPACE-hard to determine whether a specified player has a winning strategy. And if a polynomial bound is placed on the number of moves that are allowed in between jumps (which is a reasonable generalisation of the drawing rule in standard Checkers), then the problem is in PSPACE, thus it is PSPACE-complete. However, without this bound, Checkers is EXPTIME-complete.

However, other problems have only polynomial complexity:

 Can one player remove all the other player's pieces in one move (by several jumps)?
 Can one player king a piece in one move?

National and regional variants

Russian Column draughts
Column draughts (Russian towers), also known as Bashni, is a kind of draughts, known in Russia since the beginning of the nineteenth century, in which the game is played according to the usual rules of Russian draughts, but with the difference that the captured man is not removed from the playing field: rather, it is placed under the capturing piece (man or tower).

The resulting towers move around the board as a whole, "obeying" the upper piece. When taking a tower, only the uppermost piece is removed from it: and the resulting tower belongs to one player or the other according to the color of its new uppermost piece.

Bashni has inspired the games Lasca and Emergo.

Flying kings; men can capture backwards

Flying kings; men cannot capture backwards

No flying kings; men cannot capture backwards

Championships
 World Checkers/Draughts Championship in American checkers since 1840
 Draughts World Championship in international draughts since 1885
 Women's World Draughts Championship in international draughts since 1873
 Draughts-64 World Championships since 1985

Federations
 World Draughts Federation (FMJD) was founded in 1947 by four Federations: France, the Netherlands, Belgium and Switzerland.
 International Draughts Federation (IDF) was established in 2012 in Bulgaria.

Games sometimes confused with checkers variants 
 Halma: A game in which pieces move in any direction and jump over any other piece, friend or enemy (but with no captures), and players try to move them all into an opposite corner.
 Chinese checkers: Based on Halma, but uses a star-shaped board divided into equilateral triangles.
 Kōnane: "Hawaiian checkers".

See also

 List of draughts players
 Fanorona

Notes

References

Citations

Sources

External links

Draughts associations and federations

American Checker Federation (ACF)
American Pool Checkers Association (APCA)
Danish Draughts Federation
English Draughts Association (EDA)
European Draughts Confederation
German Draughts Association (DSV NRW) 
Northwest Draughts Federation (NWDF)
Polish Draughts Federation (PDF)
Surinam Draughts Federation (SDB)
World Checkers & Draughts Federation 
World Draughts Federation (FMJD)
The International Draughts Committee of the Disabled (IDCD)

History, articles, variants, rules
A Guide to Checkers Families and Rules by Sultan Ratrout
The history of checkers/draughts
Jim Loy's checkers pages with many links and articles.
Checkers Maven, CheckersUSA checkers books, electronic editions 
The Checkers Family
Alemanni Checkers Pages
On the evolution of Draughts variants
"Chess and Draughts/Checkers" by Edward Winter

 
Abstract strategy games
Traditional board games
Individual sports